Ngāti Kahungunu is a Māori iwi located along the eastern coast of the North Island of New Zealand. The iwi is traditionally centred in the Hawke's Bay and Wairārapa regions. The Kahungungu iwi also comprises 86 hapū (sub-tribes) and 90 mārae (meeting grounds).

The tribe is organised into six geographical and administrative divisions: Wairoa, Te Whanganui-ā-Orotū, Heretaunga, Tamatea, Tāmaki-nui-a Rua and Wairarapa. It is the 4th largest iwi in New Zealand by population, with 82,239 people identifying as Ngāti Kahungunu in the 2018 census.

Early history

Pre-colonisation
Ngāti Kahungunu trace their origins to the Tākitimu waka. According to Ngāti Kahungunu traditions, Tākitimu arrived in Aotearoa around 1100–1200 AD as one of the waka in the great migration. Other waka included Tainui, Te Arawa, Tokomaru, Ārai Te Uru, Mataatua, Kurahaupo, Aotea, Ngātokimatawhaorua and Horouta. According to local legend, Tākitimu and its crew were completely tapu. Its crew comprised men only: high chiefs, chiefs, tohunga and elite warriors. No cooked food was eaten before or during the voyage. The captain of Tākitimu was Tamatea Arikinui, also known as Tamatea Pokai-Whenua. He left the waka at Turanga, travelling overland until he arrived at Ahuriri in the Hawke's Bay Region. The waka Tākitimu itself continued its voyage to the South Island under a new captain, Tahu Pōtiki. It is from Tahu Pōtiki that the South Island iwi of Ngāi Tahu takes its name.

According to one account, Kahungunu was the great-grandson of Tamatea and was born in present-day Kaitaia. Other accounts indicate a more direct link, including that Kahungunu was the son of Tamatea. In either case, it has been widely recounted that Kahungunu travelled extensively through the North Island during his early adulthood, eventually settling on the East Coast of the North Island. He married several times during his travels, and as a result there are many North Island hapū that trace their lineage directly back to Kahungunu. Many of his marriages were arranged for diplomatic purposes, uniting various iwi against their enemies, forming bonds and securing peace. At some point, Kahungunu arrived at Māhia Peninsula, where he pursued and married Rongomaiwahine, a woman from Nukutaurua who was a chief in her own right. She was famously beautiful, and according to legend had issued a challenge to Kahungunu, insulting his charismatic reputation and inviting him to prove himself worthy of her. Kahungunu accepted the challenge, and after numerous trials succeeded in obtaining Rongomaiwahine's consent to marry. The iwi Ngāti Kahungunu and Ngāti Rongomaiwahine both descend from this marriage.

The eldest son of Kahungunu and Rongomaiwahine was named Kahukura-nui. His children included two sons, Rākei-hikuroa and Rakai-pāka. Rākei-hikuroa led a migration of his families and followers from Nukutaurua on the Māhia Peninsula to Heretaunga, the region known today as Hawke's Bay. Rakai-pāka remained in Nūhaka, where he remains the eponymous ancestor of the Ngāti Rakaipaaka hapū of that area. Accompanying Rākei-hikuroa from Māhia to Heretaunga was a son from one of his first marriage, Taraia. Not long after their arrival in Heretaunga, Taraia succeeded Rākei-hikuroa as the leader of their people, and he proved to be a proficient strategist in the struggle for dominance of the region, displacing the Whatumamoa, Rangitane, Ngāti Awa, and elements of the Ngāti Tara iwi, which lived in Petane, Te Whanganui-a-Orotu and Waiohiki. Within Taraia's lifetime, Heretaunga was brought under the control of his people, who became the first of the Ngāti Kahungunu in that area.

Over subsequent generations the descendants of Taraia split into various hapū. Allegiances shifted, and Māori geopolitics in the region was largely played out as an internal struggle for dominance among the hapū of Ngāti Kahungunu, with the exception of raids by Ngāti Porou and repeated attempts by Ngāti Raukawa to settle in Heretaunga. Over time, some Ngāti Kahungunu hapū settled in the Wairarapa region, finding a relatively peaceful existence there until the arrival of European settlers. Of the many hapū to emerge in Heretaunga, Ngāti Te Whatuiāpiti and Ngāti Te Ūpokoiri were two of the most dominant. The former were the people of the ancestor Te Whatuiāpiti, a great-great-grandson of Rākei-hikuroa, from his second marriage. The latter were the descendants of Taraia. A fierce rivalry developed between these two hapū.

Early 19th century
In 1807, the Musket Wars broke out as chiefs from the northern Ngāpuhi, now equipped with firearms, launched attacks on weaker tribes to the south. The ongoing conflict reached the east coast when, in 1822, a Ngāti Tuwharetoa war party led by Mananui Te Heuheu Tukino II crossed into Ngāti Kahungunu territory. Armed with muskets, Te Heuheu had come to assist Ngāti Te Ūpokoiri in retaking their lost pā of Te Roto-a-Tara, a fortified island in Lake Roto-a-Tara near the present-day site of Te Aute in Heretaunga. The pā had historically been an important strategic asset of Ngāti Te Ūpokoiri, but it had recently been occupied by Tangiteruru, a Ngāti Porou chief who had invaded Heretaunga with the help of Ngāti Maru. After the arrival of Te Heuheu's war party, Tangiteruru abandoned the pā. However it was swiftly reoccupied by Te Pareihe, a young chief of Ngāti Te Whatuiāpiti. Te Heuheu laid siege to the pā but failed to capture it. After his brother was killed in a skirmish at nearby Waimarama, Te Heuheu abandoned his siege of Roto-a-Tara and raided the pā at Waimarama instead. Following this, he returned to Ngāti Tuwharetoa to regroup and prepare for a second assault on Te Roto-a-Tara. Returning weeks later, Te Heuheu was joined by a Ngāti Raukawa war party led by Te Whatanui, and together they devised a plan to assault the island fortress. They constructed a causeway enabling them to make the crossing from the shore of the lake to Te Roto-a-Tara pā. Te Pareihe commanded such a strong resistance in the ensuing battle that Te Heuheu and Te Whatanui were thrown back in total defeat, with the loss of over 500 chiefs. Te Pareihe abandoned Te Roto-a-Tara after the battle and moved to Porangahau.

Although he had beaten back a superior force at Te Roto-a-Tara, Te Pareihe knew that the defence of Heretaunga was unsustainable without the advantage of firearms. He and fellow Ngāti Kahungunu chief Tiakitai forged an alliance with Te Wera Hauraki, a chief from Ngāpuhi who had settled on the Māhia Peninsula. Together, their forces retook Te Roto-a-Tara pā from Ngāi Te Upokoiri, who had occupied the fortress island after Te Pareihe escaped to Porangahau. But when news reached the alliance that a huge coalition of Waikato and Tuwharetoa warriors were amassing to attack Heretaunga, Te Wera agreed to protect Te Pareihe and the Ngāti Kahungunu at his fortress settlement in Māhia. Hence, in late 1823, Te Pareihe led an exodus of Ngāti Kahungunu refugees from Heretaunga to Māhia, setting off from the beach at Waimarama. Some chiefs, such as Kurupo Te Moananui, Te Hapuku, and Tiakitai, remained in Heretaunga, but most joined the exodus. By the late 1830s hostilities had ended and the Ngāti Kahungunu diaspora began returning to Heretaunga.

In 1840 a number of Ngāti Kahungunu chiefs were signatories to the Treaty of Waitangi.

Colonisation
The spread of European settlement eventually reached Ngāti Kahungunu territory, and led to the rapid acquisition of Māori land by The Crown during the 1850s and 1860s. Chiefs from the Heretaunga area, such as Te Hapuku and Henare Tomoana lost significant areas of land in sales that have since been labelled "extortionate," and which later became matters of dispute and protest. The loss of land during this period led to the emergence of the Repudiation Movement, a coalition of Ngāti Kahungunu leaders who sought to halt the rapidity of land loss in the region, and to dispute past sales.

In 1868 the Eastern Māori electorate was established in the New Zealand Parliament to provide parliamentary representation for Māori in the east of the North Island, an area encompassing Ngāti Kahungunu. The first representatives for the electorate were Ngāti Kahungunu chiefs Tareha Te Moananui (1868–1871), Karaitiana Takamoana (1871–1879), and Henare Tomoana (1879–1881). The effectiveness of Māori parliamentary representation during this period was hampered by a lack of fluent English on the part of the elected Māori representatives, and by a lack of confidence in the European parliamentary system itself, which was seen as incapable of protecting Māori interests. As a result, the Kotahitanga movement emerged in the 1890s to advocate for the establishment of an independent Māori parliament. It convened parliamentary style meetings at Pāpāwai Marae in Wairārapa and at Waipatu in Heretaunga, where key issues of importance for Māori were debated. However, by 1902 Te Kotahitanga had failed to gain recognition from the New Zealand Parliament and was therefore dissolved in favour of local Māori Councils, which were established in 1900.

20th century history

Political leadership

At the outset of the 20th century, a new generation of Māori leaders were beginning to participate in the Ngāti Kahungunu political landscape. Te Aute College had opened in 1854 near Hastings, and in the 1880s and 1890s it was attended by Āpirana Ngata, Maui Pomare, Te Rangi Hīroa (Sir Peter Buck), and Paraire Tomoana. In 1897 they formed the Te Aute College Students' Association and became active participants in public life, often mediating between the Crown and hapū in matters of local land management. In 1909 the group was joined by James Carroll and became known as the Young Māori Party.

First World War

When the First World War broke out in 1914, a number of Māori leaders responded by committing the support of their respective hapū and iwi. Alumni of the Young Māori Party, some of whom were now parliamentarians, were generally in favour of Māori enlistment and were involved in recruitment campaigns. Āpirana Ngata and Maui Pomare were the most aggressive proponents of Māori enlistment, and in Ngāti Kahungunu they received the support of Paraire Tomoana, who was the son of the chief Henare Tomoana. Tomoana worked with Ngata to drive Māori recruitment campaigns both within Ngāti Kahungunu and throughout other areas of the North Island.

Many men from Ngāti Kahungunu were among the Māori who enlisted for war. They were organised into the New Zealand (Māori) Pioneer Battalion. The battalion participated in the Gallipoli campaign in 1915 and the Western Front between 1916–1918. In January 1918 Paraire Tomoana published the words of E Pari Ra, a piece written for soldiers lost in battle. After the war this tune was adopted by the Royal New Zealand Navy as their official slow march. Other songs composed by Tomoana were Tahi nei taru kino, I runga o nga puke, Hoki hoki tonu mai, Hoea ra te waka nei, Pokarekare Ana, and the haka Tika tonu. The songs have since become treasured anthems of Ngāti Kahungunu, and in some cases were adopted by other iwi due to their wartime popularity.

Second World War

After the outbreak of the Second World War in 1939, many men from Ngāti Kahungunu again enlisted and fought overseas, primarily with the 28th (Māori) Battalion. Soldiers from the Ngāti Kahungunu region were generally organised into 'D' Company of the battalion, along with men from Waikato, Maniapoto, Wellington and the South Island. Additionally, 'D' Company also consisted of some soldiers from the Pacific Islands, and from the Chatham Islands and Stewart Island. The battalion fought in the Greek, North African and Italian campaigns, during which it earned a formidable reputation as an extremely effective fighting force. It was also the most decorated New Zealand battalion of the war. Following the end of hostilities, the battalion contributed a contingent of personnel to serve in Japan as part of the British Commonwealth Occupation Force, before it was disbanded in January 1946. Wiremu Te Tau Huata was a well known officer from Ngāti Kahungunu, having served as the Māori Battalion's military chaplain.

Late 20th century
By 1946 only a small percentage of land in the Ngāti Kahungunu region had been retained by Māori, and the traditional agrarian communities at the core of Māori society were beginning to break down as returned servicemen found employment and settled in urban areas, such as Wairoa, Napier, Hastings, and Masterton. By the year 1966, 70% of Māori men (throughout New Zealand in general) were now working in urban employment centres, particularly freezing works, sawmills, the transport industry (including road maintenance), the construction industry, and various types of factory work. In Hawke's Bay, thousands of Māori worked at the Whakatu and Tomoana freezing works sites, near Hastings. However the regional economy and well-being of the Māori community was profoundly impacted when both plants closed; Whakatu in 1986 and Tomoana in 1994.

Ngāti Kahungunu Iwi Incorporated (NKII)

Organisational structure of NKII 
In 1988, Te Rūnanganui o Ngāti Kahungunu Incorporated was established as a centralised organisation responsible for iwi development, but it went into receivership in 1994. The organisation re-emerged with a new constitution in 1996 under the name Ngāti Kahungunu Iwi Incorporated (NKII). An election was held in 1997, resulting in the establishment of an elected board of trustees and a new mandate to govern iwi development. Elections are held every three years, and all adults with a whakapapa link to a hapū of Ngāti Kahungunu are eligible to vote. The chairperson of the board of trustees usually represents the iwi in political affairs.

In accordance with the constitution of Ngāti Kahungunu Iwi Inc, the board of trustees consists of ten tangata whenua representatives:

One representative is elected within each of the six geographic and administrative divisions of the Ngāti Kahungunu area: Wairoa, Te Whanganui-ā-Orotū, Heretaunga, Tamatea, Tāmaki-nui-a Rua and Wairarapa. The constitution requires that a candidate for election to any of these positions must already be an elected board member of the Taiwhenua (local governing body) of the respective geographical subdivision.
Two representatives are elected at large by registered members of Ngāti Kahungunu who reside outside of the Ngāti Kahungunu region. This electorate is referred to in the constitution as the Taurahere Runanga. Candidates for election to these positions must have a whakapapa link to a hapū of Ngāti Kahungunu. 
One representative is elected as a kaumātua; a respected elder of the iwi who is proficient in Ngāti Kahungunu tikanga, kawa (traditional legal protocols), and reo. This representative is elected directly to the board by other kaumātua of Ngāti Kahungunu. 
One representative is elected at large by the iwi membership to the chair of the board of trustees. To be eligible for this position, the candidate must already be an elected board member of a Taiwhenua of one of the geographical subdivisions of the iwi. In addition, the candidate must be proficient in Ngāti Kahungunu tikanga, kawa, and reo. As a special provision, if the incumbent chairperson's term as a board member of a Taiwhenua expires during their tenure as chair of the iwi board, it does not disqualify them from seeking re-election.

The board employs a General Manager and staff, which oversees the operational affairs of the iwi organisation. General Managers have included Labour member of parliament Meka Whaitiri. An asset holding company was also established in 2005 to manage the iwi's investment portfolio. The company's directors include former rugby player Taine Randell.

Leadership
When Te Rūnanganui o Ngāti Kahungunu Incorporated was established in 1988, its first chairperson was Pita Sharples. By 1994 a rapid succession of other chairpeople had led the organisation, while severe disharmony between board members was increasingly hampering the board's effectiveness. As a result, a case was brought to the High Court of New Zealand, where the dysfunctionality of the board was given as evidence of the need for the court to intervene. The court placed Te Rūnanganui o Ngāti Kahungunu Incorporated into receivership, and placed it under the jurisdiction of the Māori Land Court.

After the creation of a new constitution, the period of receivership ended and in 1996 the organisation was renamed Ngāti Kahungunu Iwi Incorporated. The first election for the new board took place in March 1997.

Ngāti Kahungunu Treaty settlements

While NKII is the mandated iwi organisation (MIO) in charge of iwi development and overseeing the fisheries settlement it received in 2004, Ngāti Kahungunu have settled their Treaty settlements of historical grievances on a hapu basis. Because of this, Ngāti Kahungunu has seven separate entities that have (or are in the process of) received their Treaty settlements to govern for their respective affiliate hapu and whanau. This is contrary to a centralised iwi entity that has more power than its hapu/hapu collectives.

1997 election results

Radio Kahungunu

Radio Kahungunu is the official station of Ngāti Kahungunu. It began as Tairawhiti Polytechnic training station Te Toa Takitini 2XY, making two short-term broadcasts on 1431 AM in December 1988, and October and November 1989. It was relaunched in 1990 as Radio Kahungunu 2XT, sharing the 765 AM frequency with Hawke's Bay's Racing Radio and Radio Pacific. It began broadcasting full-time in late 1991, moved dedicated studios at Stortford Lodge in the late 1990s, and began an FM simulcast on 4 September 2000.

Notable people

See also
 Maniaiti Marae

References

Bibliography

External links
Ngāti Kahungunu Iwi Incorporated website:  Contains information on registering for the Iwi and lyrics to some of their songs, including Pōkarekare Ana.